Beyond is an American fantasy drama science fiction television series created by Adam Nussdorf that premiered on Freeform on January 1, 2017. The series stars Burkely Duffield, Dilan Gwyn, Jeff Pierre, Jonathan Whitesell, Michael McGrady, and Romy Rosemont. On January 10, 2017, Freeform renewed the series for a 10-episode second season, which premiered on January 18, 2018, and finished on March 22, 2018. On March 29, 2018, Freeform announced they had cancelled the series after two seasons.

Plot 
Holden Matthews wakes up from a 12-year coma and discovers that he now has supernatural abilities, ones that propel him into the middle of a dangerous conspiracy. Holden wants to figure out what happened to him during the past dozen years and how to live in a world that has changed significantly while he was in his coma. Perhaps the biggest question of all is why it happened to him beyond this Earth's timeline in the hereafter. As Holden tries to adjust to adulthood, a mysterious woman named Willa warns him not to trust the people around him.

Cast and characters

Main 
 Burkely Duffield as Holden Matthews
 Dilan Gwyn as Willa Frost
 Jordan Calloway as Kevin McArdle
 Jonathan Whitesell as Luke Matthews
 Michael McGrady as Tom Matthews
 Romy Rosemont as Diane Matthews
 Jeff Pierre as Jeff McArdle
 Eden Brolin as Charlie Singer (season 2; recurring season 1)

Recurring 
 Erika Alexander as Tess Shoemacher
 Peter Kelamis as The Man in the Yellow Jacket
 Alex Diakun as Arthur
 Toby Levins as Sheriff Dayton
 Chad Willett as Pastor Ian
 Kendall Cross as Mel
 Patrick Sabongui as Daniel
 Martin Donovan as Isaac Frost
 Emilija Baranac as Jamie

Production 
A pilot was green-lit for Freeform, then known as ABC Family, in April 2015. The series was ordered for production in November 2015 with a ten-episode order. A sneak peek aired on January 1, 2017, with the official premiere on January 2, 2017.

On January 10, 2017, Freeform renewed the series for a second season; season 2 premiered on January 18, 2018, with a double episode. The 10-episode second season's finale aired March 22, 2018.

Episodes

Series overview

Season 1 (2017)

Season 2 (2018) 
A recap special entitled "Beyond: What Lies Ahead" aired on December 28, 2017, and drew 357,000 viewers.

Broadcast 
Internationally, the series premiered in Australia on FOX8 on January 17, 2017. In the UK and Ireland, all ten first-season episodes were available on Netflix before their U.S. broadcasts, and new second-season episodes were added weekly.

The entire first season was released on digital platforms, such as OnDemand, the Freeform App and website, and Hulu, on January 2, 2017.

Reception

Critical reception 
On the review aggregator website Rotten Tomatoes, the first season holds an approval rating of 42% based on 12 reviews, with an average rating of 6.10/10. The site's critics consensus reads, "Beyond stays mired in contrived cliché, despite heartwarming performances from a capable cast."

Ratings 
 

| link2             = #Season 2 (2018)
| episodes2         = 10
| start2            = 
| end2              = 
| startrating2         = 0.31
| endrating2           = 0.26
| viewers2          = |2}} 
}}

Accolades

Notes

References

External links 
 
 

2010s American drama television series
2010s American mystery television series
2017 American television series debuts
2018 American television series endings
American fantasy television series
English-language television shows
Freeform (TV channel) original programming
Television series by Disney–ABC Domestic Television
American fantasy drama television series